Gordon Goplen (born 1 May 1964) is a Canadian speed skater. He competed in two events at the 1988 Winter Olympics. He was inducted into the Saskatoon Sports Hall of Fame in 1999.

References

External links
 

1964 births
Living people
Canadian male speed skaters
Olympic speed skaters of Canada
Speed skaters at the 1988 Winter Olympics
Sportspeople from Saskatoon
20th-century Canadian people